is a Japanese alpine skier. He competed at the 1964 Winter Olympics and the 1968 Winter Olympics.

References

External links
 

1942 births
Living people
Japanese male alpine skiers
Olympic alpine skiers of Japan
Alpine skiers at the 1964 Winter Olympics
Alpine skiers at the 1968 Winter Olympics
Sportspeople from Hokkaido
Universiade silver medalists for Japan
Universiade medalists in alpine skiing
Competitors at the 1964 Winter Universiade
20th-century Japanese people